Leytonstone High Road is a railway station in Leytonstone in the London Borough of Waltham Forest, on the Gospel Oak to Barking line,  down the line from  and situated between  and . Ticket machines and Oyster validators (for touching in and out) are installed under the arch at the foot of the stairs.

Although the railway crosses over the London Underground's Central line almost immediately north west of the station, there is no direct interchange;  station is about a 10-minute walk away. Despite the distance, travellers using Oyster cards can make the interchange as part of a single journey.

Service
The service has been gradually improved to provide four trains per hour in each direction on all days. The last trains in each direction run at about 11:30pm.  Services were replaced by buses from June 2016 until February 2017 while the line was being electrified (to allow major infrastructure improvements to be carried out).

History
The station opened on 9 July 1894 as "Leytonstone" with the Tottenham & Forest Gate Railway. Originally, wagons were lowered from the arches to the ground-level goods yard by means of a hydraulic hoist. The station was renamed Leytonstone High Road on 1 May 1949. The original wooden platform buildings were destroyed by fire in the 1950s.

Ticket barriers were installed in 2016.

Connections
London Buses routes 257 and W14 and night route N8 serve the station.

References

External links

Railway stations in the London Borough of Waltham Forest
DfT Category E stations
Former Tottenham and Forest Gate Railway stations
Railway stations in Great Britain opened in 1894
Railway stations served by London Overground
Leytonstone